Attorney General Hoffman may refer to:

John Jay Hoffman (born 1965), Acting Attorney General of New Jersey
Josiah Ogden Hoffman (1766–1837), Attorney General of New York
Ogden Hoffman (1793–1856), Attorney General of New York

See also
General Hoffman (disambiguation)